Brahui (also known as Brahvi or Brohi) is a Dravidian language spoken by some of the Brahui people. The language is spoken primarily in the central part of the Balochistan Province of Pakistan, with smaller communities of speakers scattered in parts of Irani Baluchestan, Afghanistan and Turkmenistan (around Merv) and by expatriate Brahui communities in Iraq, Qatar and United Arab Emirates. The Kalat, Khuzdar, Mastung, Quetta, Bolan, Nasirabad, Nushki, and Kharan districts of Balochistan Province are predominantly Brahui-speaking.

Distribution

Brahui is spoken in the central part of Pakistani Balochistan, mainly in Kalat, Khuzdar and Mastung districts, but also in smaller numbers in neighboring districts, as well as in Afghanistan which borders Pakistani Balochistan; however, many members of the ethnic group no longer speak Brahui. There are also a very small unknown number of expatriate Brahuis in the Arab States of the Persian Gulf, and Turkmenistan.

History
There is no consensus as to whether Brahui is a relatively recent language introduced into Balochistan or the remnant of a formerly more widespread Dravidian language family. According to Josef Elfenbein (1989), the most common theory is that the Brahui were part of a Dravidian migration into north-western India in the 3rd millennium BC, but unlike other Dravidians who migrated to the south, they remained in Sarawan and Jahlawan since before 2000 BC. However, some other scholars see it as a recent migrant language to its present region. They postulate that Brahui could only have migrated to Balochistan from central India after 1000 AD. This is contradicted by genetic evidence that shows the Brahui population to be indistinguishable from neighbouring Balochi speakers, and genetically distant from central Dravidian speakers. The main Iranian contributor to Brahui vocabulary, Balochi, is a Northwestern Iranian language, and moved to the area from the west only around 1000 AD. One scholar places the migration as late as the 13th or 14th century. The Brahui lexicon is believed to be of: 35% Perso-Arabic origin, 20% Balochi origin, 20% other Indo-Aryan origin, 15% Dravidian origin, and 10% unknown origin.

Franklin Southworth (2012) proposes that Brahui is not a Dravidian language, but can be linked with the remaining Dravidian languages and Elamite to form the "Zagrosian family," which originated in Southwest Asia (southern Iran) and was widely distributed in South Asia and parts of eastern West Asia before the Indo-Aryan migration.

Dialects
There are no important dialectal differences. Jhalawani (southern, centered on Khuzdar) and Sarawani (northern, centered on Kalat) dialects are distinguished by the pronunciation of *h, which is retained only in the north (Elfenbein 1997).
Brahui has been influenced by the Iranian languages spoken in the area, including Persian, Balochi and Pashto.

Phonology
Brahui vowels show a partial length distinction between long  and diphthongs  and short . Brahui does not have short /e, o/ due to influence from neighbouring Indo-Aryan and Iranic languages, the PD short *e was replaced by a, ē and i, and ∗o by ō, u and a in root syllables.

Brahui consonants show patterns of retroflexion but lack the aspiration distinctions found in surrounding languages and include several fricatives such as the voiceless lateral fricative , a sound not otherwise found in the region.
Consonants are also very similar to those of Balochi, but Brahui has more fricatives and nasals (Elfenbein 1993).

  of north corresponds to a glottal stop of south initially and intervocalically. Before a C in word-final position it is lost. Non-phonemic glottal stop before word-initial vowels, e.g. hust (N), ʔust (S) 'heart'.
  and  vary freely in many cases; contrast is limited to two or three items.
  does not occur word-initially.  →  before  in northern Brahui (Elfenbein 1998: 394), e.g. xūrt → xūṛt 'tiny'.
 The consonants  freely alternate with aspirated counterparts in the northeast. Aspirated stops word-initially occur in loanwords in the south, where they freely vary with unaspirated stops.
  occurs before velar stops .
PD. *caH- ~ *ceH- > Br. kah-.

Stress
Stress in Brahui follows a quantity-based pattern, occurring either on the first long vowel or diphthong, or on the first syllable if all vowels are short.

Orthography

Perso-Arabic script

Brahui is the only Dravidian language which is not known to have been written in a Brahmi-based script; instead, it has been written in the Arabic script since the second half of the 20th century.
In Pakistan, an Urdu based Nastaʿlīq script is used in writing:

Latin script
More recently, a Roman-based orthography named Brolikva (an abbreviation of Brahui Roman Likvar) was developed by the Brahui Language Board of the University of Balochistan in Quetta and adopted by the newspaper Talár.

Below is the new promoted Bráhuí Báşágal Brolikva orthography:

The letters with diacritics are the long vowels, post-alveolar and retroflex consonants, the voiced velar fricative and the voiceless lateral fricative.

Sample text

English
All human beings are born free and equal in dignity and rights. They are endowed with reason and conscience and should act towards one another in a spirit of brotherhood.

Arabic script
مُچَّا اِنسَاںک آجو او اِزَّت نَا رِد اَٹ بَرےبَر وَدِى مَسُّنو. اوفتے پُهِى او دَلِىل رَسےںگَانے. اَندَادے وفتے اَسِ اےلو تون اِىلُمِى اے وَدِّفوئِى اے.

Latin script
Muccá insáńk ájo o izzat ná rid aŧ barebar vadí massuno. Ofte puhí o dalíl raseńgáne. andáde ofte asi elo ton ílumí e vaddifoí e.

Endangerment
According to a 2009 UNESCO report, Brahui is one of the 27 languages of Pakistan that are facing the danger of extinction. It was classified as "unsafe", the least endangered level out of the five levels of concern (Unsafe, Definitely Endangered, Severely Endangered, Critically Endangered and Extinct). This status has since been renamed to "vulnerable".

Publications
Talár is the first daily newspaper in the Brahui language. It uses the new Roman orthography and is "an attempt to standardize and develop [the] Brahui language to meet the requirements of modern political, social and scientific discourse."

References

Sources

Bray, Denys. The Brahui Language, an Old Dravidian Language Spoken in Parts of Baluchistan and Sind: Grammar. Gian Publishing House, 1986.

External links

Online Brahui Dictionary
Handbook of the Birouhi language By Allâh Baksh (1877)
Brahui Language Board
Bráhuí Báşágal (Brahui Alphabet)
Profile of the Brahui language
Partial bibliography of scholarly works on Brahui
Britannica Brahui language
 Brahui basic lexicon at the Global Lexicostatistical Database

Agglutinative languages
Dravidian languages
Languages of Afghanistan
Languages of Iran
Languages of Iraq
Languages of Turkmenistan
Languages of Qatar
Languages of Pakistan
Languages of Balochistan, Pakistan
Arabic alphabets for South Asian languages
Vulnerable languages